MTV Unplugged: Summer Solstice is a live album by the Norwegian band a-ha, released on 6 October 2017 as part of the MTV Unplugged series. It was recorded live at the Harbour Hall at Ocean Sound Recordings in Giske, Norway, on 22 and 23 June 2017.

Commercial performance
The album debuted at number six on the UK Albums Chart with 6,982 units sold in its first week, becoming A-ha's seventh top-10 album in the United Kingdom.

Track listing
All tracks are produced by Lars Horntveth, except "Take On Me" produced by A-ha and Martin Terefe.

Notes
 "Sox of the Fox" was originally recorded as "The Vacant" on the 1980 album Fakkeltog by the band Bridges (previous band of Paul Waaktaar-Savoy and Magne Furuholmen and for whom the former was its lead singer at the time).
 "Killing Moon" is originally from Echo & the Bunnymen's album Ocean Rain (1984).

Personnel
Credits adapted from the liner notes of MTV Unplugged: Summer Solstice.

A-ha
 Morten Harket – vocals
 Magne Furuholmen – upright piano, harpsichord, celesta, acoustic guitar, flute, backing vocals
 Paul Waaktaar-Savoy – acoustic guitar, backing vocals

Additional musicians

 Alison Moyet – vocals on "Summer Moved On"
 Ian McCulloch – vocals on "Scoundrel Days" and "The Killing Moon"
 Lissie – vocals on "I've Been Losing You"
 Ingrid Helene Håvik – vocals on "The Sun Always Shines on TV"
 Lars Horntveth – acoustic guitars, resonator, lap steel guitar, vibraphone, bass clarinet, soprano saxophone
 Morten Qvenild – upright piano, harpsichord, harmonium, dulcitone, Fischers mandolinette, autoharp, kokles
 Even Enersen Ormestad – bass
 Karl Oluf Wenneberg – drums, percussion, bells, bass xylophone
 Madeleine Ossum – violin, backing vocals
 Emilie Heldal Lidsheim – viola, backing vocals
 Tove Margrethe Erikstad – cello, backing vocals
 Lars Horntveth – arrangement on all tracks except "Take On Me"
 Martin Terefe – arrangement on "Take On Me"
 Anders Tjore – co-arrangement on "I've Been Losing You", "The Sun Always Shines on TV", "This Alone Is Love", "Summer Moved On" and "Manhattan Skyline"

Technical

 Lars Horntveth – production on all tracks except "Take On Me"
 A-ha – production on "Take On Me"
 Martin Terefe – production on "Take On Me"
 John O'Mahony – recording, mixing
 Henning Svoren – recording
 Marcus Forsgren – recording (demo sessions)
 Greg Calbi – mastering

Artwork
 Max Dax – liner notes
 Justin Loomis – photography
 Matthias Löwenstein – artwork, cover
 Season Zero – artwork, cover

Charts

Weekly charts

Year-end charts

References

2017 live albums
A-ha albums
Mtv Unplugged Summer Solstice
Polydor Records live albums